Dutee is a male given name of Irish origin. People with the name include:

Dutee Arnold (1763–1849), Justice of the Rhode Island Supreme Court
Dutee Wilcox Flint (1882–1961), Rhode Island state senator and business magnate
Dutee Jerauld Pearce (1789–1849), United States Representative from Rhode Island
Dutee A. Whelan (1879–1939), Wisconsin farmer, businessman, and politician

See also
Dutee Chand (born 1996), Indian female professional sprinter